Calocera cornea is a jelly fungus that grows on decaying wood. It is a member of the Dacrymycetales, an order of fungi characterized by their unique "tuning fork" basidia.

Its yellow, finger-like, tapering basidiocarps are somewhat gelatinous in texture. In typical specimens the basidiocarps become up to 3 mm in diameter, and 2 cm in height. The hymenium covers the sides of the basidiocarps, each basidium producing and forcibly discharging only two basidiospores.

It is inedible. Calocera viscosa is related.

References

Further reading 
C.J. Alexopolous, Charles W. Mims, M. Blackwell et al., Introductory Mycology, 4th ed. (John Wiley and Sons, Hoboken NJ, 2004) 
McNabb R.F.R. 1965a. Taxonomic studies in the Dacrymycetaceae II. Calocera (Fries) Fries. New Zealand J. Bot. 3: 31–58.

External links
Friday Fellow: Club-like Tuning Fork at Earthling Nature.
Messiah.edu

Dacrymycetes
Fungi of Europe
Fungi described in 1783
Inedible fungi
Taxa named by August Batsch
Fungi of North America